Pope Park is a public park in Hartford, Connecticut that was originally landscaped by the Olmsted Brothers. The park was donated to the city in 1895 by Colonel Albert Augustus Pope for use by his employees and city residents. Colonel Pope was the founder of Pope Manufacturing Company which built both automobiles and bicycles including the Columbia bicycle. The park was landscaped by the Olmsted Brothers design firm in 1898. In its original form, the park consisted of  laid out in three sections. Today it still contains its original pond and grass lawns.

As of January 21, 2016, Pope Park is scheduled to undergo a major cleanup to remove litter, waste and overgrown vegetation.

References

Geography of Hartford, Connecticut
Parks in Hartford County, Connecticut
Tourist attractions in Hartford, Connecticut
Urban public parks